Cariani is a surname. Notable people with the surname include:

Giovanni Cariani (1490–1547), Italian painter
John Cariani (born 1969), American actor and playwright